Rouleau (French for "roll" or "roller"; plural rouleaux) can refer to:

People
 For a list of people with Rouleau as a surname, see Rouleau (surname).
 Alexandre Rouleau, Canadian ice hockey player 
 Alfred Rouleau, businessman
 Joseph Rouleau, opera singer
 Duncan Rouleau, comic book writer and artist

Places
 Rouleau, Saskatchewan

Things
 rouleaux, a stack of red blood cells

 (textiles) A decorative technique that involves creating patterns with piping, cording or bias tape. A rouleau loop uses the same cord or piping as a way of fastening buttons, most notably down the back of bridal gowns.

See also
 Reuleaux (disambiguation)